The molecular formula C9H10N2O (molar mass: 162.19 g/mol, exact mass: 162.0793 u) may refer to:

 Phenidone, or 1-phenyl-3-pyrazolidinone
 Aminorex (McN-742)

Molecular formulas